Crazy Rain is an EP from singer-songwriter/multi-instrumentalist Joseph Arthur. The 8-song EP was released in the US on April 15, 2008. Crazy Rain is the second in a series of four EPs released in anticipation for the release of Joseph's seventh studio album Temporary People on September 30. From Billboard.com:

The lyrics to "Killer's Knife" first appeared in Joseph's poem "111704. Minneapolis." in 2004. The song was then known under the name "Heartbeart" and the lyrics had a few different lines. Greg Dulli provides backing vocals on "Nothin' 2 Hide."

Track listing

Notes 
 Recorded and produced by Joseph Arthur, Mathias Schneeberger, and Jennifer Turner.
 Musicians: Joseph Arthur, Mathias Schneeberger, Jennifer Turner, and Dave Rosser.
 Guest vocals on "Killer's Knife" by James Hall.
 Guest vocals on "Nothin' 2 Hide" by Greg Dulli.
 Photography by Danny Clinch.
 Lonely Astronaut Records #LA004.

References 

Joseph Arthur albums
2008 EPs
Lonely Astronaut Records EPs